Beat It is a 1918 American short comedy film featuring Harold Lloyd.

Cast
 Harold Lloyd
 Snub Pollard
 Bebe Daniels
 William Blaisdell
 Sammy Brooks
 Lige Conley (as Lige Cromley)
 William Gillespie
 Maynard Laswell (as M.A. Laswell)
 Gus Leonard
 Belle Mitchell
 William Strohbach (as William Strawback)
 Dorothea Wolbert
 King Zany (as Charles Dill)

See also
 Harold Lloyd filmography

References

External links

1918 films
1918 short films
Silent American comedy films
American silent short films
American black-and-white films
Films directed by Gilbert Pratt
1918 comedy films
Films with screenplays by H. M. Walker
American comedy short films
1910s American films